Jane Smisor Bastien (15 January 1936 – 27 March 2018) was an American author and educator, best known for publishing works on teaching piano methods and techniques. She published more than 500 books that were translated into sixteen languages.

Biography
Jane Smisor Bastien was born 15 January 1936. She graduated from Barnard College in 1957 and received a masters from Teachers College, Columbia University. While at Columbia, she met fellow student Neil A. Kjos Jr., who later became president of Neil A. Kjos Music Company. She met James Bastien in New Orleans, Louisiana and they married in 1961.

Bastien taught at H. Sophie Newcomb Memorial College at Tulane University. Bastien, along with her husband James, wrote numerous books on piano teaching. The Music Teachers National Association awarded her the Lifetime Achievement Award in 1999 and the Citation for Leadership in 2018. She died 27 March 2018.

References

External links
Jane Bastien NAMM Oral History Interview (2006)

1936 births
2018 deaths
American women writers
Barnard College alumni
People from Hutchinson, Kansas
Teachers College, Columbia University alumni
Tulane University faculty
American women academics
21st-century American women